Eduard Francis Ayala (born March 28, 1992 in Tuguegarao City, Cagayan Province), professionally known as Lucho Ayala, is a Filipino actor who made his debut on GMA network's First Time and made a remarkable appearance on the fantasy series Indio when he played young Juancho Sanreal.

Filmography
Television Series

Television Anthologies

Films

References

External links
 

1992 births
Living people
Filipino male child actors
Filipino male television actors
Filipino male models
GMA Network personalities
Filipino male film actors